The Sinfin Branch Line is a railway line in the Sinfin area of Derby, Derbyshire. It lies within the premises of Rolls-Royce and other works sites. The line was opened by the British Railways Board for passengers on 4 October 1976 and closed in 1998.

History

Melbourne Line
The line was originally double tracked (with various sidings) and stretched to Chellaston Junction with the Castle Donington Line. Beyond this it carried on to Melbourne. This original line closed in 1930.

Sinfin Branch Line
The line reopened on 4 October 1976 for passengers. Derby City Council attempted to create a cross-city line, interworking with the Derwent Valley Line to Matlock. The service was poorly used because of the time of the last train and because it was served by only four trains per day.  

The service was reduced to a single early morning service in 1992, and the last train ran on 21 May 1993. The single service was replaced with a taxi that ran from Derby railway station. On 2 May 1997 the line became part of the Central Trains franchise on the privatisation of British Rail, but no Central Trains services ever used the line. On 6 November 1997 Central Trains and the Director of Passenger Rail Franchising proposed the closure of the line. This was granted on 21 May 1998 by the Rail Regulator John Swift QC.

Despite the line's closure the timetable continued to be called Sinfin-Derby to Matlock until the May 2001 timetable change and the train that used to run the line terminated at Peartree railway station until May 2001.

The line had two stations: Sinfin North and Sinfin Central.

Current status
The line survives as a freight line serving the Rolls-Royce plant with a 0926 Thursdays-only freight train carrying aviation fuel. Both platforms still exist, although Sinfin North railway station has become overgrown. There is occasional talk of reopening the line and extending it into Chellaston and onto East Midlands Airport but these look unlikely in the near future. As part of the closure decision neither station could be demolished until 21 May 2008.

References

External links
Closure acceptance from Rail Regulator

Rail transport in Derby
Closed railway lines in the East Midlands